Women You Rarely Greet is a 1925 German silent film directed by Frederic Zelnik and starring Lya Mara, Alfons Fryland, and Leo Connard.

Cast

References

External links

Films of the Weimar Republic
Films directed by Frederic Zelnik
German silent feature films
German black-and-white films